Angel of Vengeance may refer to:

Film
 Ms .45, a 1981 revenge film also known as Angel of Vengeance
 Angel of Vengeance (1987 film), a 1987 revenge film directed by Ted V. Mikels and Ray Dennis Steckler
 Angel of Vengeance (Miao jie shi san mei), a 1993 Taiwan-Hong Kong film starring Alex Fong

Television
 Angel of Vengeance (TV series), a 1993 Singaporean TV series starring Chen Tianwen
 Acrata, a DC Comics character who acts as the Angel of Vengeance in the TV series Smallville

See also
 Angels of Vengeance (Birmingham novel), the third book in John Birmingham's Disappearance series